Darrel Wilson (born ) is a Northern Irish male compound archer and part of the Irish national team. He has represented Northern Ireland at numerous British Championships at both junior and senior level. He has participated in the 2013 World Archery Championships in Antalya, the 2015 World Archery Championships in Copenhagen, the World Field Championships in Dublin 2016 and Italy in 2018. He also holds multiple National records and has won numerous National titles in Target and Field Archery. Darrel was British Field Champion in 2016. Darrel has competed at the Commonwealth Games, Archery World Cups, World target championships, European Championships and World Field Championships. Darrel has won the Northern Irish Indoor and Outdoor Championships more times than any other archer.

References

1980 births
Living people
British male archers
Place of birth missing (living people)
Archers at the 2010 Commonwealth Games
Commonwealth Games competitors for Northern Ireland